Bogambara Grama Niladhari Division is a Grama Niladhari Division of the Kandy Four Gravets & Gangawata Korale Divisional Secretariat of Kandy District of Central Province, Sri Lanka. It has Grama Niladhari Division Code 264.

Bogambara Stadium, Bogambara Prison, Wales Park, Kandy railway station, Teaching Hospital, Kandy, Kandy General Post Office, Kandy City Centre, National Institute of Fundamental Studies (NIFS), Arthur's Seat, Kandy and Kandy Clock Tower are located within, nearby or associated with Bogambara.

Bogambara is a surrounded by the Malwatta, Hanthna Pedesa, Nagasthenna, Deiyannewela, Ihala Katukele and Mahanuwara Grama Niladhari Divisions.

Demographics

Ethnicity 

The Bogambara Grama Niladhari Division has a Sinhalese majority (84.6%). In comparison, the Kandy Four Gravets & Gangawata Korale Divisional Secretariat (which contains the Bogambara Grama Niladhari Division) has a Sinhalese majority (74.6%) and a significant Moor population (10.9%)

Religion 

The Bogambara Grama Niladhari Division has a Buddhist majority (81.1%). In comparison, the Kandy Four Gravets & Gangawata Korale Divisional Secretariat (which contains the Bogambara Grama Niladhari Division) has a Buddhist majority (70.9%), a significant Muslim population (12.0%) and a significant Hindu population (10.2%)

Gallery

References 

Grama Niladhari divisions of Sri Lanka
Kandy District